Hassan, Hasan, Hassane, Haasana, Hassaan,  Asan, Hassun, Hasun, Hassen, Hasson or  Hasani may refer to:

People
Hassan (given name), Arabic given name and a list of people with that given name
Hassan (surname), Arabic, Jewish, Irish, and Scottish surname and a list of people with that surname

Places
Hassan (crater), an impact crater on Enceladus, a moon of Saturn

Africa 
Abou El Hassan District, Algeria
Hassan Tower, the minaret of an incomplete mosque in Rabat, Morocco
Hassan I Dam, on the Lakhdar River in Morocco
Hassan I Airport, serving El Aaiún, Western Sahara

Americas 
Chanhassen, Minnesota, a city in Minnesota, United States
Hassan Township, Minnesota, a city in Minnesota, United States

Asia 
Hassan, Karnataka, a city and district headquarters in Karnataka, India
Hassan District, a district headquartered in Karnataka, India
Hassan (Lok Sabha constituency)
Hassan Airport, Karnataka
Hass, Syria, a town in Idlib Governorate, Syria
Hasan, Ilam, a village in Ilam Province, Iran
Hasan, North Khorasan, a village in North Khorasan Province, Iran
Hasan, West Azerbaijan, a village in West Azerbaijan Province, Iran
Hasani, Iran, a village in Fars Province, Iran
Hasanov (town), a town in Tajikistan
Hosen, a moshav in northern Israel
Al-Hassan Stadium, a football stadium in Irbid, Jordan
Hassan Town, a locality in Lahore, Pakistan
Hasan or Khasan (urban-type settlement), a settlement in Primorsky Krai, Russia
Lake Hasan or Lake Khasan, a lake in Primorsky Krai, Russia
Mount Hasan, volcano in Turkey
Hassan district, a place in India

Europe 
Hasan, Albania, a village in Durrës County, Albania
Hašani, a village in Bosnia
Hasanovići, a village in Bosnia
Asanovac, a village in Serbia

Sporting events
Hassan II Trophy, a football tournament in Morocco
Hassan II Golf Trophy, a golf tournament in Morocco
Grand Prix Hassan II, a tennis tournament in Morocco

Other uses
Hassans, the largest law firm in Gibraltar
Hasan (hadith), the categorization of a hadith's authenticity as acceptable for use as a religious evidence
Hassan Uprising (1903–1904), a rebellion among the Moro people during the Philippine–American War
Hassan (character), a character from the Pakistani drama serial Dastaan
Hassan, a 1922 play by James Elroy Flecker 
Hasan-i Sabbah, a character in the Fate universe

See also
Bani Hasan (disambiguation)
Khasan (disambiguation)
Hassan Mosque (disambiguation)
Beni Ḥassān, a historical Arabian nomadic group
Hassaniya, a variety of Arabic spoken by the Beni Hassan
Awlad Hassan, an Arabic-speaking ethnic group of Sudan 
Asan, Guam, a community located on the U.S. territory of Guam
Asan, a city in South Chungcheong Province, South Korea
Hassane, the traditionally dominant warrior tribes of Mauritania and Western Sahara
Hassan-i Sabbah, the founder of the Assassins